WLRP (1460 AM, "Radio Raíces 1460 AM") is a radio station licensed to serve San Sebastián, Puerto Rico. The station is owned by Las Raíces Pepinianas, Inc. The station has been on the air since January 6, 1965. It airs news, talk shows, and music in a Spanish variety format. The station was assigned the WLRP call letters by the Federal Communications Commission on July 12, 1982.

References

External links

 https://www.radioraices1460.com

LRP
Radio stations established in 1965
San Sebastián, Puerto Rico
1965 establishments in Puerto Rico